Districts of Burgenland

Bezirk Oberwart is a district in the state of Burgenland in Austria. The population of the district, as of 2022, is 54,353. The largest settlements in the district are Oberwart, Pinkafeld and Großpetersdorf.

Municipalities

References